The East Neuk or East Neuk of Fife is an area of the coast of Fife, Scotland.

"Neuk" is the Scots word for nook or corner, and the East Neuk is generally accepted to comprise the fishing villages of the most northerly part of the Firth of Forth and the land and villages slightly inland therefrom. As such it would include Elie and Earlsferry, Colinsburgh, St Monans, Pittenweem, Arncroach, Carnbee, Anstruther, Cellardyke, Kilrenny, Crail and Kingsbarns and the immediate hinterland, as far as the upland area known as the Riggin o Fife.

The area houses a Cold War era bunker near Crail. Built in the late 1950s to be a regional seat of government in the event of a nuclear war, it is now a tourist attraction.

See also
Fife Coastal Path

References

External links
 Collins Encyclopaedia of Scotland, John Keay
 The East Neuk of Fife: Its History and Antiquities, Geology, Botany, and Natural History in General, Rev. Walter Wood, A.M.
 Rick Steves' Great Britain 2008, Rick Steves
 Biographical Dictionary of Eminent Men of Fife, M. F. Conolly 1866
 Fife Place-name Data

Geography of Fife